When Jeremy Hardy Spoke to the Nation was a 2-part look back at the life and work of Jeremy Hardy, which aired on BBC Radio 4 in May 2019.

The show was narrated by Sandi Toksvig, his close friend, and produced by David Tyler, his longest-term collaborator.

References 

BBC Radio 4 programmes